Geudertheim is a commune in the Bas-Rhin department in Grand Est in north-eastern France.

Geography
Geudertheim is a village in the Basse Zorn district, in the heart of the Alsace Asparagus Country, positioned halfway between Haguenau and Strasbourg. Neighbouring villages are Hœrdt to the south, Bietlenheim to the east, Brumath to the west and Weitbruch to the north.

Notable people
  General Georges Picquart, who played a key role in the Dreyfus Affair, spent his early childhood in Geudertheim. On 13 July 2006, almost a century after the exoneration of Dreyfus, the Place de la Mairie was renamed Place General Picquart in his honour.
 Balthazar Alexis Henri Schauenburg, (also spelled Schauenbourg), (born in Hellimer on 31 July 1748) died in Geudertheim on 1 September 1831) was a French general who served in the wars of the French Revolution and the Empire.

Landmarks
 The Protestant church dates from 1842:  the church tower is from the twelfth century, however.
 The Roman Catholic Church dates from 1900.   Attached to it is the fifteenth-century funerary chapel of the Schauenbourg family along with a fifteenth-century tabernacle considered one of the most beautiful in Alsace.
 Castle Schauenbourg.
 A mill on the river Zorn.

See also
 Communes of the Bas-Rhin department

References

External links
 Official Website of Geudertheim

Communes of Bas-Rhin
Bas-Rhin communes articles needing translation from French Wikipedia